Hoole Urban District was an Urban District in Cheshire between 1894 and 1954, when it was absorbed by Chester CB and Chester Rural Districts.

The archives are now with Cheshire Archives and Local History.

References

Urban districts of England
History of Cheshire